Gehnäll Persson (21 August 1910 – 16 July 1976) was a Swedish Army fanjunkare and equestrian.

Career
Persson was born on 21 August 1910 in Steneby, Sweden, the son of Sven Persson and Bertha Andersson.

He competed in dressage at the 1948, 1952 and 1956 Olympics and won team gold medals in 1952 and 1956; he finished fourth individually in 1956.

At the 1948 Olympics the Swedish team won with a wide margin and received gold medals. The team was disqualified in 1949 after it was found that Persson was only a fanjunkare, temporarily promoted to the rank of lieutenant specifically to circumvent the "Officers and Gentlemen only" eligibility rule at the time. Later that year the International Federation for Equestrian Sports relaxed its eligibility rule to allow non-commissioned ranks (and women) to compete.

Personal life
In 1938, he married Ruth Jansson (born 1914), the daughter of Richard Jansson and Elin Larsson. He was the father of Lars Ove (born 1943) and Anders (born 1951).

Awards and decorations
H. M. The King's Medal
Swedish Women’s Auxiliary Veterinary Corps' Silver Medal (Svenska Blå Stjärnans silvermedalj)

References

External links

1910 births
1976 deaths
Swedish Army personnel
Swedish dressage riders
Olympic equestrians of Sweden
Swedish male equestrians
Equestrians at the 1948 Summer Olympics
Equestrians at the 1952 Summer Olympics
Equestrians at the 1956 Summer Olympics
Olympic gold medalists for Sweden
Olympic medalists in equestrian
People from Bengtsfors Municipality
Medalists at the 1956 Summer Olympics
Medalists at the 1952 Summer Olympics
Sportspeople from Västra Götaland County